Javad Arianmanesh() (born September 21, 1953) is an Iranian retired football player. He is currently an MP in Iranian Parliament representing Mashhad and Kalat.

Football career
He played for Payam Mashhad during the 1970s and 1980s. He was captain of the team for many years. After retirement, he also held various  positions such as member of the executive committee of F.C. Aboomoslem and also head of Khorasan Province Football Association.

External links
Personal web blog

References

1953 births
Living people
Sportspeople from Mashhad
Iranian footballers
Payam Mashhad players
Deputies of Mashhad and Kalat
Members of the 7th Islamic Consultative Assembly
Members of the 8th Islamic Consultative Assembly
Islamic Coalition Party politicians
Iranian sportsperson-politicians
Association footballers not categorized by position